Niklas Lomb (born 28 July 1993) is a German professional footballer who plays as a goalkeeper for Bundesliga club Bayer Leverkusen.

Career
Lomb came through Bayer Leverkusen's youth setup and made his debut for the club in a UEFA Europa League tie against Rosenborg on 6 December 2012.

During the first half of the 2014–15 Bundesliga, he was goalkeeper number three for Bayer Leverkusen, being left out of the squad in all official matches. Subsequently he was loaned to 3. Liga side Hallescher FC for the remainder of the season.

In 2018, Lomb was loaned to SV Sandhausen for one year.

In 2020, Lomb renews with Bayer Leverkusen.

References

External links
 
 

1993 births
Living people
German footballers
Footballers from Cologne
Association football goalkeepers
Bundesliga players
2. Bundesliga players
3. Liga players
Bayer 04 Leverkusen II players
Bayer 04 Leverkusen players
Hallescher FC players
SV Sandhausen players
SC Preußen Münster players